Gagea dubia is a Mediterranean species of plants in the lily family. It is native to Morocco, Spain, France, Sardinia, Sicily, Greece including Crete, Turkey, Syria, Lebanon, and Iran.

Gagea dubia is a bulb-forming herb with yellow flowers.

References

dubia
Plants described in 1904